Charles Bernard Desormes (3 June 1777 – 30 August 1862) was a French physicist and chemist. He determined the ratio of the specific heats of gases in 1819. He did this and almost all his scientific work in collaboration with his son-in-law Nicolas Clément (1779–1841). Clément and Desormes correctly determined the composition of carbon disulfide (CS2) and carbon monoxide (CO) in 1801–02. In 1806 they elucidated all the chemical reactions that take place during the production of sulfuric acid by the lead chamber method, as used in industrial chemistry. In 1813 they made a study of iodine and its compounds.

Desormes was born in Dijon, Côte-d'Or. He was a student at the École Polytechnique in Paris from 1794, when it opened, and subsequently worked there as a demonstrator. Désormes met Clément at the Ecole Polytechnique 1801, beginning a scientific collaboration that lasted until 1824. He left the Ecole 1804 to establish an alum refinery at Verberie, Oise, with Clément and Joseph Montgolfier, who had earlier pioneered balloon flight. Desormes was elected counsellor for Oise 1830 and in 1848 to the national assembly, in which he sat with the moderate republicans. He died in Verberie.

References

External links
 Farlex.com

1771 births
1862 deaths
Scientists from Dijon
Politicians from Dijon
Moderate Republicans (France)
Members of the 1848 Constituent Assembly
19th-century French chemists
19th-century French physicists
École Polytechnique alumni
Members of the French Academy of Sciences